Iglesia de Santa María (Arbazal) is a 13th-century (romanesque, or "romanica") church in the concejo of Villaviciosa, in the Principality of Asturias, Spain. It is unusual in having preserved the fabric of an earlier construction dated between the 8th and 10th centuries.

References

Churches in Asturias
13th-century Roman Catholic church buildings in Spain
Bien de Interés Cultural landmarks in Asturias